Chandpuri is an Indian toponymic surname for people from Chandpur, Bijnor, in Uttar Pradesh or other places named Chandpur. It may refer to:
Kausar Chandpuri (1900–1990), Indian physician and writer 
Kuldip Singh Chandpuri (born 1940), Indian military officer 
Qayem Chandpuri (1722–1793), Indian poet 
Raaz Chandpuri (1892–1969), Urdu writer and literary critic

Urdu-language surnames
Indian surnames
Toponymic surnames
People from Bijnor district
Nisbas